Ambonus electus is a species of beetle in the family Cerambycidae. It was described by Gahan in 1903.

References

Elaphidiini
Beetles described in 1903